American Insurance Association v. Garamendi, 539 U.S. 396 (2003), was a case in which the Supreme Court of the United States invalidated a California law that required any insurance company wishing to do business in the state to publish information regarding insurance policies held by persons in Europe from 1920 through 1945.

Background
The Holocaust Victim Insurance Relief Act (HVIRA) was enacted in 1999 by the California State Legislature in "an attempt to facilitate Holocaust-era insurance claims by California residents." The law required that insurance companies in California that sold policies to people in Europe between 1920 and 1945 to go public with the records of their work during that time, "including the names of policy owners and the status of the policies." American Insurance, along with several other insurance companies and trade associations filed suit claiming that the Act exceeded the powers of the State of California since it is the federal government that has the power to regulate commerce and foreign affairs. The District Court ruled in favor of the plaintiffs, however the 9th Circuit Court of Appeals reversed the decision.

Question before the Supreme Court
Does the HVIRA "interfere with the federal government's sovereignty over foreign affairs established by Article 1 of the Constitution?"

Decision of the Court
In a 5–4 decision in favor of American Insurance Association, Justice Souter wrote the majority opinion for the Supreme Court. The Court held that California's HVIRA "interfere with the president's ability to conduct the nation's foreign policy and is therefore preempted."

See also 
 Zschernig v. Miller: Oregon law with foreign policy implications

References

External links
 

Insurance in the United States
The Holocaust and the United States
United States Constitution Article Two case law
United States federalism case law
United States lawsuits
United States Supreme Court cases
United States Supreme Court cases of the Rehnquist Court
2003 in United States case law
2003 in the United States